Bribri is the capital city of the canton of Talamanca in the province of Limón in Costa Rica.

References

Populated places in Limón Province